The  2021 United States Open Championship was the 121st U.S. Open, the national open golf championship of the United States. It was a 72-hole stroke play tournament that was played June 17–20 on the South Course at Torrey Pines Golf Course in La Jolla, San Diego, California. The South Course previously hosted in 2008, which was won by Tiger Woods in a playoff.

The field consisted of 156 players, with 88 gaining their place through automatic exemption criteria and the remaining 68 making it through qualifying, including two alternates. The defending champion was Bryson DeChambeau, who won the 120th U.S. Open, which had been postponed due to the COVID-19 pandemic, at Winged Foot in September 2020.

Jon Rahm made a birdie on each of the final two holes to become the first U.S. Open champion from Spain and win his first major championship. Rahm finished one shot ahead of South African Louis Oosthuizen, who had held a share of the lead going into the final round. Two strokes further back in third place was American Harris English. DeChambeau had moved into the lead midway through the final round, but fell away with two bogeys, a double-bogey and a quadruple-bogey on the back-nine to finish outside the top twenty. During the tournament, Englishman Richard Bland became the oldest player to hold a share of the 36-hole lead in a U.S. Open; he finished tied for 50th place.

Course

Torrey Pines Golf Course is situated in La Jolla, San Diego and has two 18-hole golf courses, the North Course and the South Course. The U.S. Open was held on the South Course, which previously hosted the championship in 2008, when Tiger Woods defeated Rocco Mediate on the first sudden-death extra hole after they remained tied following an 18-hole playoff. The Farmers Insurance Open, a PGA Tour event formerly known as the San Diego Open, is held annually over both courses.

Length of the course for previous major:
 , par 71 – 2008 U.S. Open

Field
The field for the U.S. Open is made up of players who gain entry through qualifying events and those who are exempt from qualifying. The exemption criteria include provision for recent major champions, winners of major amateur events, and leading players in the world rankings. Qualifying is in two stages, local and final, with some players being exempted though to final qualifying.

Exemptions
This list details the exemption criteria for the 2021 U.S. Open and the players who qualified under them; any additional criteria under which players were exempt is indicated in parentheses.

1. Recent winners of the U.S. Open (2011–2020)

Bryson DeChambeau (2,10,11,15)
Dustin Johnson (2,5,10,11,15)
Martin Kaymer
Brooks Koepka (6,15)
Rory McIlroy (2,8,10,15)
Justin Rose (15)
Webb Simpson (2,10,15)
Jordan Spieth (7,15)
Gary Woodland (15)

2. The leading ten players, and those tying for tenth place, in the 2020 U.S. Open

Harris English (10,15)
Tony Finau (10,15)
Zach Johnson
Louis Oosthuizen (15)
Xander Schauffele (10,15)
Justin Thomas (6,8,10,11,15)
Matthew Wolff (15)
Will Zalatoris (15)

3. The winner of the 2020 U.S. Amateur

Tyler Strafaci

4. The runner-up in the 2020 U.S. Amateur

Ollie Osborne (a)

5. Recent winners of the Masters Tournament (2017–2021)

Sergio García (15)
Hideki Matsuyama (10,15)
Patrick Reed (10,15)

Tiger Woods did not play.

6. Recent winners of the PGA Championship (2016–2021)

Phil Mickelson (15,18)
Collin Morikawa (10,11,15)
Jimmy Walker

7. Recent winners of The Open Championship (2016–2019)

Shane Lowry (15)
Francesco Molinari
Henrik Stenson

8. Recent winners of The Players Championship (2019–2021)

9. The winner of the 2020 BMW PGA Championship

Tyrrell Hatton (10,15)

10. All players who qualified for the 2020 Tour Championship

Abraham Ancer (15)
Daniel Berger (15)
Cameron Champ
Lanto Griffin
Billy Horschel (15)
Viktor Hovland (15)
Mackenzie Hughes
Im Sung-jae (15)
Kevin Kisner (15)
Marc Leishman (15)
Sebastián Muñoz
Kevin Na (15)
Joaquín Niemann (15)
Ryan Palmer (15)
Jon Rahm (11,15)
Scottie Scheffler (15)
Cameron Smith (15)
Brendon Todd

11. Winners of multiple PGA Tour events from the originally scheduled date of the 2020
U.S. Open (June 21, 2020) to the start of the 2021 tournament

Patrick Cantlay (15)
Stewart Cink (15)
Jason Kokrak (15)

12. The leading 10 points winners from the "European Qualifying Series" who are not otherwise exempt

Marcus Armitage
Richard Bland
Dave Coupland
Thomas Detry
Adrian Meronk
Guido Migliozzi
Edoardo Molinari
Jordan Smith
Matthew Southgate

Mikko Korhonen did not play.

13. The winner of the 2020 Amateur Championship

Joe Long (a)

14. The winner of the Mark H. McCormack Medal in 2020

Takumi Kanaya

15. The leading 60 players on the Official World Golf Ranking as of May 24, 2021

Christiaan Bezuidenhout
Sam Burns
Paul Casey
Corey Conners
Matt Fitzpatrick
Tommy Fleetwood
Brian Harman
Russell Henley
Garrick Higgo
Max Homa
Matt Jones
Kim Si-woo
Matt Kuchar
Lee Kyoung-hoon
Robert MacIntyre
Carlos Ortiz
Victor Perez
Adam Scott
Kevin Streelman
Matt Wallace
Bubba Watson
Lee Westwood

16. The leading 60 players on the Official World Golf Ranking if not otherwise exempt as of June 7, 2021

Charley Hoffman
Ian Poulter
Bernd Wiesberger

17. The leading player from each of the 2020–21 Asian Tour, 2020–21 PGA Tour of Australasia and 2021–22 Sunshine Tour Orders of Merit

Brad Kennedy
Wilco Nienaber
Wade Ormsby

18. Special exemptions

Qualifiers
Initially, eleven final qualifying events were scheduled, nine of which are in the United States: In April, a further venue was added in South Carolina. A final qualifier scheduled for June 7 at RattleSnake Point Golf Club in Milton, Ontario, was canceled due to COVID-19 restrictions in Canada.

Alternates who gained entry
The following players gained a place in the field having finished as the leading alternates in the specified final qualifying events:
Cole Hammer (a, Columbus) – replaced Korhonen
Zack Sucher (Hilton Head) – took the final spot that was held open until the conclusion of the Palmetto Championship

Round summaries

First round
Thursday, June 17, 2021
Friday, June 18, 2021

Fog delayed the start by 90 minutes and, as a result, 36 players did not complete their opening round before play was suspended due to darkness. Russell Henley led with a 4-under-par round of 67, with Louis Oosthuizen also on 4-under-par with two holes to play. Rafa Cabrera-Bello and Francesco Molinari were a stroke behind after rounds of 68. Defending champion, Bryson DeChambeau, had a round of 73 while PGA champion Phil Mickelson scored 75. Play resumed early on Friday, with Oosthuizen finishing with two pars to join Henley at 4-under-par.

Second round
Friday, June 18, 2021

First-round co-leader Russell Henley took the outright lead at six-under after hitting his approach shot to the par-3 8th hole (his 17th) to seven feet and making the putt for birdie. On the par-5 9th, his last of the round, he missed a four-foot putt for par to suffer his first bogey of the round and fall back to five-under following a one-under 70. Richard Bland, making his first U.S. Open appearance in 12 years, made three birdies in a five-hole stretch on his closing nine to also get to six-under before a bogey at the 8th. At the age of 48, Bland became the oldest player to hold a share of the 36-hole lead in U.S. Open history.

Matthew Wolff, runner-up in 2020, did not make a bogey over his last 16 holes and two-putted for birdie on the par-5 18th after reaching the green in two shots; he shot 68 (−3) and finished the round at four-under for the tournament, tied for third with Louis Oosthuizen and a shot off the lead. Oosthuizen was two-over on his round through 13 holes before birdies on the 14th and 18th to shoot even-par 71.

Bubba Watson did not record a par over his last seven holes, making five birdies and two bogeys for a round of 67 (−4), tied for lowest of the day with Bland, Collin Morikawa, and Mackenzie Hughes. Jon Rahm, less than two weeks after being forced to withdraw from the Memorial Tournament after testing positive for COVID-19, birdied the 18th to complete a one-under round and tie Watson at three-under for the tournament, in a tie for fifth place. Two-time champion Brooks Koepka got to within one shot of the lead after two birdies in his first four holes but made five bogeys the rest of the round to fall back to even-par.

The 36-hole cut came at 146 (+4). Notables to miss the cut included past champions Justin Rose and Webb Simpson. Hayden Buckley, who began the round tied for fifth place, shot 11-over 82 to miss the cut by five. None of the nine amateurs made the cut.

Third round
Saturday, June 19, 2021

Louis Oosthuizen made a 51-foot eagle putt on the 18th hole to tie Russell Henley and Mackenzie Hughes for the 54-hole lead at five-under. Hughes made his own 63-foot putt for eagle on the 13th, then holed out from five feet for birdie on 18 to shoot 68 (−3). Hughes became the first Canadian to hold the lead after the third round at the U.S. Open. Henley, co-leader after the first two rounds, holed out from a greenside bunker for birdie on the par-3 11th and saved par from a bunker on the last hole to shoot even-par.

Rory McIlroy made four birdies on the back-nine, including a chip-in from the rough to the right of the green on the 12th, and tied for the lowest round of the day at 67 (−4). He finished at three-under, two shots off the lead. Defending champion Bryson DeChambeau did not make a bogey in a three-under round of 68 to tie McIlroy for fourth place.

Richard Bland, co-leader with Henley coming into the round, did not make a birdie and shot six-over 77, falling to a tie for 21st place.

Final round
Sunday, June 20, 2021

Summary
Jon Rahm birdied both the 17th and 18th holes to win his first U.S. Open title and first career major championship. A shot behind leader Louis Oosthuizen playing the par-4 17th, Rahm hit his approach to 25 feet and made the putt to tie for the lead at five-under. On the par-5 18th, he found a greenside bunker with his second shot, chipped out to 18 feet, and holed the putt to finish at six-under for the tournament. Rahm became the first player since Tom Watson in 1982 to win the U.S. Open with birdies on the final two holes.

A crowded leaderboard had 10 players within a shot of the lead at one point. Oosthuizen, a co-leader coming in the round, was one-over on his round before making consecutive birdies on holes 9 and 10 to get to six-under and lead by two. He bogeyed the par-3 11th after hitting his approach into the rough to the right of the green, then, on the 17th, drove into a penalty area off the tee and made another bogey. Needing an eagle on the 18th, his third shot from short of the green flew 10 feet past the hole. Oosthuizen settled for his sixth career runner-up finish in a major and second at the U.S. Open.

Defending champion Bryson DeChambeau took sole possession of the lead after nearly making a hole-in-one on the par-3 eighth. But he then bogeyed both the 11th and 12th before making double-bogey on the par-5 13th and quadruple-bogey eight on the 17th. He played his final nine holes in eight-over to fall to a tie for 26th place. Rory McIlroy, 2011 champion, got into a share of the lead on the front-nine but fell from contention with a double bogey on the 12th after his second shot plugged in the greenside bunker; he finished at one-under, five shots back and in a tie for seventh.

Two-time champion Brooks Koepka was four-under on his round and just a shot off the lead after making a 16-foot birdie putt on the 15th but bogeyed two of his final three holes to finish at two-under.

Russell Henley and Mackenzie Hughes, part of a three-way tie for the lead at the start of the round, both fell outside the top-10. Henley went three-over on the front-nine and made only one birdie in a five-over round of 76 to finish in 13th. Hughes double-bogeyed the 11th after his tee shot got stuck in a tree; he shot 77 (+6) and finished tied for 15th.

Final leaderboard

Scorecard

{|class="wikitable" span = 50 style="font-size:85%;
|-
|style="background: Pink;" width=10|
|Birdie
|style="background: PaleGreen;" width=10|
|Bogey
|style="background: Green;" width=10|
|Double bogey
|style="background: Olive;" width=10|
|Triple bogey+ 
|}

Media
This was the second consecutive U.S. Open televised by Golf Channel and NBC. In the UK and Ireland, Sky Sports broadcast the event.

Notes

References

External links

United States Golf Association
Coverage on the PGA Tour's official site
Coverage on the European Tour's official site
Coverage on the PGA of America's official site

U.S. Open (golf)
Golf in California
Sports competitions in San Diego
U.S. Open
U.S. Open (golf)
U.S. Open
U.S. Open